The Theban Tomb TT93 is located in Sheikh Abd el-Qurna, part of the Theban Necropolis, on the west bank of the Nile, opposite to Luxor. The tomb belongs to an 18th Dynasty ancient Egyptian named Qenamun, who was the overseer of the cattle of Amun and chief steward of Amenhotep II. More than eighty epiteths of Qenamun were found in the tomb. Qenamun's mother, Amenemipet, was a wet nurse of Amenhotep II, which effectively made Qenamun a foster brother to the young prince that would become king.

History
The tomb was known in the early nineteenth century and was visited by Champollion, Wilkinson, Lepsius and Prisse d'Avennes, but remained largely neglected until the late 1920s when the Metropolitan Museum of Art published The tomb of Ken-Amun at Thebes, which details the exploration and documents the content of the tomb.

See also
 List of Theban tombs

References

Bibliography
Davies, Norman de Garis. (1930). The tomb of Ken-Amun at Thebes

Theban tombs
Ancient Egyptian overseers of the cattle